First American Bank is a commercial bank headquartered in Elk Grove, Illinois United States. It is an Illinois chartered non-national bank and is not related to any banks by the same name outside of the states of Illinois, Florida and Wisconsin. It is a Federal Deposit Insurance Corporation member.

General
First American Bank was chartered in 1974 in Illinois as "First American Bancorp, Inc." to serve the Chicago area. The company was dissolved in 1990 to be restructured under its current name. It is a privately owned company with 80% of its assets owned by the officers, directors, and family members.

References

External link
"About First American Bank".

Banks established in 1974
Banks based in Illinois
Companies based in Cook County, Illinois